Johnson South Reef, also known in Mandarin ; Mabini Reef), is a reef in the southwest portion of the Union Banks in the Spratly Islands of the South China Sea. It is controlled by the People's Republic of China (PRC), but its ownership is disputed and also claimed by the Philippines, Taiwan (ROC), and Vietnam.

Location, topography and structures  

It is naturally above water only at low tide. Prior to 2014 it housed a number of small buildings, wharves and a fortified Chinese maritime observation station.

On 12 July 2016, the tribunal of the Permanent Court of Arbitration concluded that Johnson Reef contains, within the meaning of Article 121(1) of the United Nations Convention on the Law of the Sea (UNCLOS), naturally formed areas of land, surrounded by water, which are above water at high tide. However, for purposes of Article 121(3) of UNCLOS, the high-tide features at Johnson Reef are "rocks that cannot sustain human habitation or economic life of their own and accordingly shall be entitled to 12nm of territorial sea measured from its baseline but have no exclusive economic zone or continental shelf".

Territorial disputes 

Johnson South Reef has been occupied by the People's Republic of China since 1988, and is claimed by Vietnam. It was the site of the 1988 Johnson South Reef Skirmish between the PRC and Vietnam that resulted in the death of 64 Vietnamese soldiers, two Vietnamese boats being sunk, and the Chinese occupying the reef. The PRC government constructed an embankment building on the reef in the early 1990s.

In July 2012, to further reinforce their claim, a Chinese fleet of 29 fishing vessels from Hainan protected by Yuzheng 310 (a fishery administration patrol ship) spent 20 days fishing in the region.

Military development

In late 2016, photographs emerged which suggested that the expanded reef has been armed with anti-aircraft guns and a CIWS missile-defence system.

See also
 Great wall of sand
 Johnson South Reef Skirmish
 Nine-dotted line
 Sino-Vietnamese conflicts 1979-1990

References

External links
Asia Maritime Transparency Initiative Island Tracker
Our World Flashpoint: South China Sea, BBC, film documentary, July 2015.

Reefs of the Spratly Islands
Union Banks
Artificial islands of Asia